Marlind Lutfi Nuriu (born 5 July 1997) is an Albanian professional footballer who plays as a defender for Kastrioti (loan)    and the Albania national under-21 team.

Club career

Early career
Nuriu started his youth career at a local club in Tirana KDK. In 2013, he moved at KF Tirana academy and in 2014 he signed for the club's first team.

Tirana 
He made his debut for Tirana on 28 September 2016 in the Albanian Cup match against Sopoti Librazhd.

Loan to Dinamo Tirana
On 9 January 2018 Nuriu was loaned out to fellow Albanian First Division side Dinamo Tirana for the remainder of the 2017–18 season to gain more playing experience.

International career

Albania U21 
He was called up at the Albania national under-21 football team by coach Alban Bushi for a double Friendly match against Moldova U21 on 25 & 27 March 2017.

2019 UEFA European Under-21 Championship qualification
Nuriu was called up for the Friendly match against France U21 on 5 June 2017 and the 2019 UEFA European Under-21 Championship qualification opening match against Estonia U21 on 12 June 2017. In the opening match of the qualifiers against Estonia U21, Nuriu was an unused substitute in the bench for the entire match.

Career statistics

Club

Honours

Club
Tirana
 Kategoria Superiore: 2021–22
 Albanian Cup: 2016–17
 Albanian Supercup: 2017

References

External links

1997 births
Living people
Footballers from Tirana
Albanian footballers
Association football defenders
Albania youth international footballers
Albania under-21 international footballers
KF Tirana players
FK Dinamo Tirana players
KF Skënderbeu Korçë players
Kategoria Superiore players
Kategoria e Dytë players